This is a list of members of the Connecticut General Assembly from Norwalk, Connecticut since the founding of the settlement in 1651 to the present.

Seventeenth century

Eighteenth century

Nineteenth century

Twentieth century

Creation of districts (1967) 
The January 1967 regular session was the first in which its members were elected by district.

Twenty-first century

See also 
 Connecticut's 137th assembly district
 Connecticut's 138th assembly district
 Connecticut's 139th assembly district
 Connecticut's 140th assembly district
 Connecticut's 141st assembly district
 Connecticut's 142nd assembly district
 Connecticut's 145th assembly district
 Connecticut's 12th Senate district
 Connecticut's 25th Senate district
 History of Norwalk, Connecticut
 List of mayors of Norwalk, Connecticut

References 

Lists of Connecticut politicians
History of Norwalk, Connecticut
Norwalk